The 2011 Auburn Tigers football team represented Auburn University in the 2011 NCAA Division I FBS football season. The team was coached by Gene Chizik, who was in his third season with Auburn. The Tigers played their home games at Jordan–Hare Stadium in Auburn, Alabama, and competed in the Western Division of the Southeastern Conference (SEC). The Tigers entered the 2011 season after winning the 2011 BCS National Championship.  Auburn finished the year 8–5 overall and 4–4 in SEC play to place fourth in the Western Division. They were invited to the Chick-fil-A Bowl, where they defeated Virginia, 43–24.

Previous season
During the 2010–2011 campaign, the Tigers finished the season undefeated, 14–0, with wins over No. 12 South Carolina, No. 12 Arkansas, No. 6 LSU, longtime rival Georgia, No. 9 Alabama, No. 18 South Carolina for a second time in the SEC Championship, and No. 2 Oregon in the BCS National Championship Game. They finished the season as the consensus National Champions, being voted No. 1 in the AP and Coaches' Polls in securing Auburn's first national title since 1957. In addition to the national title, junior quarterback  Cam Newton became the third Auburn player to win the Heisman Trophy.

Coaching staff

Returning starters

Offense

Defense

Special teams

Key losses
QB Cam Newton
RB Mario Fannin
WR Darvin Adams
WR Terell Zachery
WR Kodi Burns
LT Lee Ziemba
LG Mike Berry
C  Ryan Pugh
RG Byron Isom
DE Antoine Carter
DE Micheal Goggans
NG Zach Clayton
NT Nick Fairley
NT Mike Blanc
LB Josh Bynes
LB Craig Stevens
CB Demond Washington
K  Wes Byrum
P  Ryan Shoemaker

Dismissed from team

HB Eric Smith
WR Antonio Goodwin
WR Shaun Kitchens
TE Dakota Mosely
SS Mike McNeil

Quit team during spring

 WR Derek Winters
 WR Philip Pierre Louis
 TE Robert Cooper
 OT Roszell Gayden
 OT Andre Harris
 LB Jessel Curry

Current roster

 1 WR Trovon Reid (RFr)-projected starter
 3 WR DeAngelo Benton (Jr)
 5 RB Michael Dyer (So)-projected starter
 5 LB Jake Holland (So)-projected starter
 6 CB Jonathan Mincy (RFr)
 8 RB Anthony Gulley-Morgan (RSo)
 9 WR Quindarius Carr (Sr)
 9 CB Ryan White (So)
10 LB LaDarius Owens (RFr)
11 CB Chris Davis (So)
12 FS Demetruce McNeal (So)-projected starter
13 DE Craig Sanders (So)
14 QB Barrett Trotter (Jr)-projected starter
15 QB Clint Moseley (So)
15 CB Neiko Thorpe (Sr)-projected starter
16 FS Ikeem Means (Jr)
18 QB Logan Paul (So)
20 SS Drew Cole (Sr)
21 LB Eltoro Freeman (Jr)
22 CB T'Sharvin Bell (Jr)-projected starter
23 RB Onterio McCalebb (Jr)
25 LB Daren Bates (Jr)-projected starter
28 CB Jonathan Rose (Fr)
29 K  Chandler Brooks (Sr)
30 P  Steven Clarke (So)-projected starter
35 LB Jonathan Evans (Jr)-projected starter
36 K  Cody Parkey (So)-projected starter
37 FB LaDarius Phillips (RFr)-projected starter
38 LB Jawara White (RFr)
40 HB Chris Humpheries (Sr)
43 TE Philip Lutzenkirchen (Jr)-projected starter
45 RB Davis Hooper (Sr)
50 C  Reese Dismukes (Fr)-projected starter
52 DE Justin Delaine (RFr)
54 NT Jeff Whitaker (So)-projected starter
55 DE Corey Lemonier (So)-projected starter
58 LB Harris Gaston (So)
60 OG Eric Mack (RFr)
61 LS Josh Harris (Jr)-projected starter
62 LT Chris Slade (RFr)
63 C  Blake Burgess (So)
65 C  Tunde Funiyike (RFr)
66 OG Thomas O'Reilly (Fr)
68 OG Ed Christian (RFr)
70 OG Shon Coleman (Fr)
71 RG John Sullen (Jr)-projected starter
74 NT Jamar Travis (Jr)
75 OT Brandon Mosely (Sr)-projected starter
77 OT A.J. Greene (Sr)-projected starter
78 OT Aubrey Phillips (Fr)
79 OG Jarod Cooper (Sr)-projected starter
80 WR Emory Blake (Jr)-projected starter
83 TE Chad Croce (So)
85 WR Travante Stallworth (RSo)
91 DE Joel Bonomolo (RJr)
92 NG Kenneth Carter (So)-projected starter
94 DE Nosa Equae (So)-projected starter
95 DE Dee Ford (Jr)
97 NG Derrick Lykes (Sr)

Transfers

RB Mike Blakely (Fr)- University Of Florida
RB Corey Grant (RFr)-University Of Alabama

Schedule

Source: Official schedule

Game summaries

Utah State

Mississippi State

Clemson

Florida Atlantic

South Carolina

Arkansas

Florida

LSU

Ole Miss

Georgia

Samford

Alabama

Virginia

Recruiting class

Rankings

References

Auburn
Auburn Tigers football seasons
Peach Bowl champion seasons
Auburn Tigers football